Athletes from East Germany (German Democratic Republic) competed at the 1968 Summer Olympics in Mexico City, Mexico. 226 competitors, 186 men and 40 women, took part in 124 events in 18 sports. It was the first time that West Germany (Federal Republic of Germany) and East Germany had sent separate teams to the Summer Olympic Games.

Medalists

Gold
 Christoph Höhne — Athletics, Men's 50 km Walk
 Margitta Gummel — Athletics, Women's Shot Put
 Manfred Wolke — Boxing, Men's Welterweight
 Heinz-Jürgen Bothe and Jörg Lucke — Rowing, Men's Coxless Pairs
 Dieter Schubert, Frank Forberger, Dieter Grahn, and Frank Rühle — Rowing, Men's Coxless Fours
 Roland Matthes — Swimming, Men's 100m Backstroke
 Roland Matthes — Swimming, Men's 200m Backstroke
 Rudolf Vesper — Wrestling, Men's Greco-Roman Welterweight
 Lothar Metz — Wrestling, Men's Greco-Roman Middleweight

Silver

 Klaus Beer — Athletics, Men's Long Jump
 Lothar Milde — Athletics, Men's Discus Throw
 Marita Lange — Athletics, Women's Shot Put
 Erika Zuchold — Gymnastics, Women's Side Horse Vault
 Karin Janz — Gymnastics, Women's Asymmetrical Bars
 Peter Kremtz, Dieter Semetzky, Manfred Gelpke, Roland Göhler and Klaus Jacob — Rowing, Men's Coxed Fours
 Frank Wiegand, Horst-Günter Gregor, Eugen Henninger, and Roland Matthes — Swimming, Men's 4 × 100 m Medley Relay
 Helga Lindner — Swimming, Women's 200m Butterfly
 Gabriele Wetzko, Gabriele Perthes, Roswitha Krause, and Uta Schmuck — Swimming, Women's 4 × 100 m Freestyle Relay

Bronze
 Wolfgang Nordwig — Athletics, Men's Pole Vault
 Siegfried Fülle, Klaus Köste, Peter Weber, Günter Beier, Matthias Brehme, and Gerhard Dietrich — Gymnastics, Men's Team Combined Exercises
 Magdalena Schmidt, Ute Starke, Erika Zuchold, Maritta Bauerschmidt, Karin Janz, and Marianne Noack — Gymnastics, Women's Team Combined Exercises
 Harald Vollmar — Shooting, Men's Free Pistol
 Kurt Czekalla — Shooting, Men's Trap Shooting
 Sabine Steinbach — Swimming, Women's 400m Individual Medley
 Paul Borowski, Karl-Heinz Thun, and Konrad Weichert — Sailing, Men's Dragon

Athletics

Boxing

Canoeing

Cycling

Ten cyclists represented East Germany in 1968.

Team time trial
 Klaus Ampler
 Günter Hoffmann
 Dieter Grabe
 Axel Peschel

1000m time trial
 Heinz Richter

Tandem
 Werner Otto
 Jürgen Geschke

Team pursuit
 Heinz Richter
 Wolfgang Schmelzer
 Rudolf Franz
 Manfred Ulbricht

Diving

Equestrian

Fencing

Four fencers, all men, represented East Germany in 1968.

Men's épée
 Hans-Peter Schulze
 Klaus Dumke
 Harry Fiedler

Men's team épée
 Bernd Uhlig, Klaus Dumke, Harry Fiedler, Hans-Peter Schulze

Field hockey

Fourteen male field hockey players competed in 1968, when the East German team finished in 11th place.
 Rainer Stephan
 Axel Thieme
 Eckhard Wallossek
 Klaus Bahner
 Horst Brennecke
 Dieter Klauß
 Lothar Lippert
 Dieter Ehrlich
 Karlheinz Freiberger
 Reinhart Sasse
 Hans-Dietrich Sasse
 Rolf Thieme
 Klaus Träumer
 Helmut Rabis

Gymnastics

Modern pentathlon

Three male pentathlete represented East Germany in 1968.

Individual
 Karl-Heinz Kutschke
 Jörg Tscherner
 Wolfgang Lüderitz

Team
 Karl-Heinz Kutschke
 Jörg Tscherner
 Wolfgang Lüderitz

Rowing

East Germany had 26 male rowers participate in all seven rowing events in 1968.

 Men's single sculls
 Achim Hill

 Men's double sculls
 Uli Schmied
 Manfred Haake

 Men's coxless pair – 1st place ( gold medal)
 Jörg Lucke
 Heinz-Jürgen Bothe

 Men's coxed pair
 Helmut Wollmann
 Wolfgang Gunkel
 Klaus-Dieter Neubert

 Men's coxless four – 1st place ( gold medal)
 Frank Forberger
 Dieter Grahn
 Frank Rühle
 Dieter Schubert

 Men's coxed four – 2nd place ( silver medal)
 Peter Kremtz
 Roland Göhler
 Manfred Gelpke
 Klaus Jacob
 Dieter Semetzky

 Men's eight
 Günter Bergau
 Klaus-Dieter Bähr
 Claus Wilke
 Peter Gorny
 Reinhard Zerfowski
 Peter Hein
 Manfred Schneider
 Peter Prompe
 Karl-Heinz Danielowski

Sailing

Shooting

Nine shooters, all men, represented East Germany in 1968. Harald Vollmar won bronze in the 50 m pistol and Kurt Czekalla won bronze in the trap.

25 m pistol
 Christian Düring
 Gerhard Dommrich

50 m pistol
 Harald Vollmar
 Helmut Artelt

300 m rifle, three positions
 Hartmut Sommer
 Uto Wunderlich

50 m rifle, three positions
 Uto Wunderlich
 Hartmut Sommer

50 m rifle, prone
 Hartmut Sommer
 Werner Heyn

Trap
 Kurt Czekalla
 Rudolf Hager

Swimming

Volleyball

Men's team competition
 Round robin
 Lost to Czechoslovakia (2-3)
 Lost to Japan (0-3)
 Defeated Mexico (3-0)
 Defeated Belgium (3-0)
 Lost to Soviet Union (2-3)
 Defeated United States (3-0)
 Defeated Brazil (3-1)
 Defeated Bulgaria (3-2)
 Defeated Poland (3-0) → Fourth place

 Team roster
 Horst Peter
 Eckhardt Tielscher
 Siegfried Schneider
 Manfred Heine
 Rainer Tscharke
 Eckehard Pietzsch
 Arnold Schulz
 Rudi Schumann
 Jürgen Kessel
 Walter Toissant
 Jürgen Freiwald
 Wolfgang Webner

Water polo

Men's Team Competition
 Preliminary Round (Group B)
 Defeated Mexico (12:4)
 Tied with Yugoslavia (4:4)
 Lost to Italy (4:5)
 Defeated Greece (11:4)
 Defeated Japan (8:0)
 Defeated United Arab Republic (19:2)
 Defeated Netherlands (8:3)
 Classification Matches
 5th/8th place: Defeated Cuba (8:2)
 5th/6th place: Lost to United States (4:6) → Sixth place
 Team Roster
 Hans-Georg Fehn
 Hans-Ulrich Lange
 Hans-Jürgen Schüler
 Manfred Herzog
 Peter Rund
 Veit Herrmanns
 Jürgen Kluge
 Jürgen Thiel
 Klaus Schlenkrich
 Peter Schmidt
 Siegfried Ballerstedt

Weightlifting

Wrestling

References

External links
 Official Olympic Reports
 International Olympic Committee results database

Germany, East
1968
Summer Olympics